Arkel is a railway station, located in Arkel in the Netherlands. The station is located on the Qbuzz line between Dordrecht and Geldermalsen. It was opened on 1 December 1883, was closed on 15 May 1938 and was reopened on 10 June 1940. Originally, Arkel had two tracks, in the 1980s this was reduced to a single track. Train services are operated by Qbuzz. The station building is now in use as an office.

Train services

Bus services

External links
Arriva website 
Dutch Public Transport journey planner 

Railway stations in South Holland
Railway stations opened in 1883
Railway stations closed in 1938
Railway stations opened in 1940
Railway stations on the Merwede-Lingelijn
Molenlanden